Wang Jingjiu or Wang Ching-chiu (王敬久) (1902–1968) was a general in China's National Revolutionary Army. He commanded the 87th Division and was engaged in the Chinese Civil War and suppressing the Chahar People's Anti-Japanese Army in 1933.  His Division became one of the Chinese-German trained Divisions forme in 1936–37. It fought under the 71st Corps at the Battle of Shanghai and Battle of Nanking. The following year he commanded 25th Corps in the Battle of Wuhan and in the Battle of Nanchang in 1939. He later commanded the 10th Army Group in the Battle of Zhejiang-Jiangxi of 1942, Western Hubei Campaign of 1943, and Western Hunan Campaign of 1945.

Military Career

1933-1937 General Officer Commanding 87th Division
1937 General Officer Commanding LXXI Corps
1938-1941 General Officer Commanding XXV Corps
1942 - 1945 Commander in Chief 10th Army Group
1946 Commander in Chief 32nd Army Group

References

Hsu Long-hsuen and Chang Ming-kai, History of The Sino-Japanese War (1937–1945) 2nd Ed., 1971. Translated by Wen Ha-hsiung, Chung Wu Publishing; 33, 140th Lane, Tung-hwa Street, Taipei, Taiwan Republic of China.
Generals from China: http://www.generals.dk/nation/China.html

National Revolutionary Army generals
1902 births
1968 deaths